Sebastián Baldassarri is a Paralympian athlete from Argentina competing mainly in category F11 shot put events.

Baldassarri first competed in 2004 Summer Paralympics where he competed in the F11 shot put.  Four years later in Beijing at the 2008 Summer Paralympics he competed in both the shot put and the discus, winning a silver medal in the F11/12 discus.

References

External links
 

Paralympic athletes of Argentina
Argentine male discus throwers
Argentine male shot putters
Athletes (track and field) at the 2004 Summer Paralympics
Athletes (track and field) at the 2008 Summer Paralympics
Paralympic silver medalists for Argentina
Living people
Year of birth missing (living people)
Medalists at the 2008 Summer Paralympics
Paralympic medalists in athletics (track and field)
Medalists at the 2011 Parapan American Games
Medalists at the 2015 Parapan American Games